Robert Kent may refer to:
 Robert E. Kent (1911–1984), American film writer and film producer
 Robert Craig Kent (1828–1905), attorney and political figure from the Commonwealth of Virginia
 Robert Kent (actor) (1908–1955), American actor
 Robert Kent (quarterback) (born 1980), American football player
 Robert John Kent (1835–1893), lawyer and politician in Newfoundland
 Robert Thurston Kent (1880–1947), American mechanical engineer
 Murder of Bobby Kent (1973–1993), Iranian-American man murdered by seven people
 Ralph S. Kent, mistakenly named Robert, American football coach

See also
 Robert Kent Gooch (1893–1982), American football player